HD 13189 is an 8th magnitude star in Triangulum constellation.

In 2005, a planetary companion or brown dwarf was announced in orbit around this star.

It has a spectral classification of K1II-III, making it a giant star that has evolved away from the main sequence. The atmosphere of the star displays short period radial velocity variations with a primary period of 4.89 days. This behavior is typical for giant K-type stars such as this and it is not the result of a close-orbit planetary companion.

HD 13189 b 

HD 13189 b is an exoplanet or brown dwarf with mass ranges from 8 to 20 Jupiter mass. This object is located at a mean distance of 277 Gm (1.85 AU) from the star, taking 472 days to make one elliptical orbit.

This object was discovered in Tautenburg, Germany in 2005.

References

External links 
 
 

013189
010085
Triangulum (constellation)
K-type bright giants
Brown dwarfs
Durchmusterung objects
K-type giants